Bocundji Cá (born 28 December 1986) is a Bissau-Guinean former professional footballer who played as a midfielder. He spent the entirety of his career in France while representing the Guinea-Bissau national team at international level.

Club career
Born in Biombo, Guinea-Bissau, Cá played for French side FC Nantes's youth teams since 2002 and got his professional debut against Stade Rennais on 15 January 2005. Despite playing well for Nantes in the 2006–07 season, he suffered relegation at the end of the season.

On 31 May 2009, AS Nancy signed Cá until June 2012. After one year with Nancy he returned to play on loan for Tours FC. On 26 July 2011, he signed a three-year contract with Stade de Reims.

International career
Cá was called up to the Guinea national team squad on 28 August 2006, qualifying due to family roots.

References

External links

1986 births
Living people
People from Biombo Region
Bissau-Guinean people of Guinean descent
Bissau-Guinean footballers
Association football midfielders
Guinea-Bissau international footballers
2017 Africa Cup of Nations players
FC Nantes players
Tours FC players
AS Nancy Lorraine players
Stade de Reims players
Paris FC players
SC Bastia players
Ligue 1 players
Ligue 2 players
Championnat National players
Bissau-Guinean expatriate footballers
Bissau-Guinean expatriate sportspeople in France
Expatriate footballers in France